Henning Heyerdahl Tønsberg jr. (1907–1987) was a Norwegian mountain climber, photographer, ski jumper and pharmacist.

As a ski jumper, he won the competition in Solbergbakken, Hannibalbakken and the Holmenkollen Ski Festival in 1927. He won Galdhøpiggrennet in 1934. In June 1936, he participated the expedition to recover three bodies from Lihesten after the Havørn Accident. On 22 August, Schlytter and three others in the expedition were awarded the Medal for Heroic Deeds. He was president of Norsk Tindeklub from 1948 to 1952. He became director of Løvens Kemiske Fabrikk from 1963.

References
Bibliography
 

Notes

Norwegian mountain climbers
20th-century Norwegian businesspeople
Norwegian male ski jumpers
Norwegian photographers
1907 births
1987 deaths
Recipients of the Norwegian Medal for Heroic Deeds
Norwegian pharmacists
Norwegian magazine founders